is a metro station in Nishi-ku, Kobe, Hyōgo Prefecture, Japan.

Lines
Kobe Municipal Subway
Seishin-Yamate Line Station S15

Layout
There are two side platforms serving a track each on the second floor of the station.

Railway stations in Hyōgo Prefecture
Stations of Kobe Municipal Subway
Railway stations in Japan opened in 1987